Uniformed Derby is the name given to football matches that involves Home United and Warriors FC. The derby started since the 90's as both are quite successful teams in Singapore.

History 
Home United FC was founded in 1940 and its current head coach is Aidil Sharin. Its actual name was Police FC for the Singapore Police Force and changed to the current name in 1997 as it includes HomeTeam departments of the Singapore Ministry of Home Affairs such as the Singapore Civil Defence Force and the Immigration and Checkpoints Authority.

Warriors FC was founded in 1975 and its current head coach is Razif Onn. They were previously known as the Singapore Armed Forces Football Club (SAFFC) since their establishment on 16 February 1996.

Stadiums

List of matches 

From 2009 to current

Honours 
Honours counted for the S.League, Singapore Cup, Singapore League Cup and the Singapore Community Shield.

References 

Sports terminology